David Sayre Hayes (born December 31, 1941) is a former Republican member of the Pennsylvania House of Representatives.

References

Republican Party members of the Pennsylvania House of Representatives
Living people
1941 births